The Munsungan-Chase Lake Thoroughfare Archeological District encompasses a series of important archaeological sites in a remote area of northern Maine, United States.  These sites offer evidence of human habitation dating to not long after the retreat of the glaciers following the Wisconsin glaciation, with extensive stone tool workshops working with red chert found in abundance in the area.  Stone tools made from sources in this region have been found at archaeological sites across New England.  The district was listed on the National Register of Historic Places in 1979.

Description
Munsungan (or Munsungun) Lake and Chase Lake are located in far northern Piscataquis County, Maine, draining via Munsungan Stream and the Aroostook River into the Saint John River.  The two lakes are connected to each other by a relatively short waterway called The Thoroughfare.  In the area on either side of the lakes there are a series of rock outcrops containing a variety of chert that early human occupants found useful for the manufacture of stone tools. Although the lakes probably had a higher level then than they do now, a series of well-drained terraces on either side of The Thoroughfare were apparently favorable for the habitation.

Archaeological investigation of the larger region have identified more than 100 sites of interest. The Thoroughfare region includes seven areas where evidence habitation dating from the Ceramic period to the Paleoindian have been identified. Both of these were excavated in the early 1980s.

Munsungan Lake

Native populations of togue and land-locked Atlantic salmon use the cold-water habitat of this deep lake. These large fish prey on rainbow smelt and squaretail spawning in tributaries Atkins Brook, Bluffer Brook, Cedar Brook, Chase Brook, Currier Brook, Munsungan Brook, Norway Brook, and Reed Brook.

See also
National Register of Historic Places listings in Piscataquis County, Maine

References

Archaeological sites on the National Register of Historic Places in Maine
Geography of Piscataquis County, Maine
North Maine Woods
Historic districts on the National Register of Historic Places in Maine
National Register of Historic Places in Piscataquis County, Maine
Lakes of Piscataquis County, Maine
Saint John River (Bay of Fundy)
Lakes of Maine